Qeshlaq-e Yilatan ol Hurdi Dowlat (also Romanized as Qeshlāq-e Yīlātān ol Hūrdī Dowlat) is a village in Qeshlaq-e Jonubi Rural District, Qeshlaq Dasht District, Bileh Savar County, Ardabil Province, Iran. At the 2006 census, its population was 24, in 4 families.

References 

Populated places in Bileh Savar County
Towns and villages in Bileh Savar County